Sulfitobacter brevis is a species of bacteria isolated from the hypersaline, heliothermal and meromictic Antarctic Ekho Lake. It is Gram-negative, aerobic, pointed and budding, with type strain EL-162T (= DSM 11443T).

References

Further reading

External links

LPSN
Type strain of Sulfitobacter brevis at BacDive -  the Bacterial Diversity Metadatabase

Rhodobacteraceae